

Portugal
 Angola – António de Lencastre, Governor of Angola (1772–1779)
 Macau –
 D. Alexdra da Silva Pedrosa Guimares, Governor of Macau (1777–1778)
 Jose Vicente da Silveira Meneses, Governor of Macau (1778–1780)

Colonial governors
Colonial governors
1778